The Montreal Standard, later known as The Standard, was a national weekly pictorial newspaper published in Montreal, Quebec, founded by Hugh Graham. It operated from 1905 to 1951.

History
The Standard began publishing in 1905 as a Saturday-only newspaper on the model of the Illustrated London News. This format continued during World War I and World War II. Through time, the Standard reduced its size from broadsheet to tabloid,  and it became more of a feature-oriented weekly emphasizing feature writing, recipes, fiction, cartoons and, increasingly, illustrations and photographs over news items.

In 1925, Graham sold the paper, along with other media properties including the Montreal Star, to John Wilson McConnell. The Standard was available in Montreal as a free weekend supplement to the Montreal Star and nationally through subscription and newsstands and was a rival to the Toronto-based Star Weekly. In 1947, the Standard wooed away popular cartoonist Jimmy Frise from the Star Weekly but as the Star Weekly retained the rights to the name of Frise's popular Birdseye Center comic strip, the cartoon was renamed Juniper Junction.  Another comic strip, "Doug Wright's Family", was launched at the Standard in 1949.

In 1951, the Standard was changed to a magazine format and relaunched as Weekend Picture Magazine (later Weekend)  that was distributed across Canada as a weekend supplement to local newspapers. As Weekend the publication focussed on feature writing, photography and comics and dropped the Standard's news and fiction components.

Notable contributors to the newspaper include Mavis Gallant, who was on staff as a feature reporter from 1944 to 1950, and Lawrence Earl, who was a war correspondent and photojournalist for the paper during World War II.

See also
 List of newspapers in Canada

References

Magazines published in Montreal
Weekly magazines published in Canada
Defunct magazines published in Canada
1905 establishments in Quebec
1951 disestablishments in Quebec
Newspaper supplements
Magazines established in 1905
Magazines disestablished in 1951